St. Paul's Episcopal Church, also known as St. Paul's Episcopal Chapel, is an historic Carpenter Gothic church located at 14755 Oak Avenue, in Magnolia Springs, Alabama. On September 25, 1988, it was added to the National Register of Historic Places.

It is also included in the Magnolia Springs Historic District, as a contributing building.

National Register listing
St. Paul's Episcopal Church
(added 1988 - Building - #88001355)
N side Oak St., Magnolia Springs
Historic Significance: 	Architecture/Engineering
Architect, builder, or engineer: 	Unknown
Architectural Style: 	Late Gothic Revival
Area of Significance: 	Architecture
Period of Significance: 	1900-1924
Owner: 	Private
Historic Function: 	Religion
Historic Sub-function: 	Religious Structure
Current Function: 	Religion
Current Sub-function: 	Religious Structure

See also

List of Registered Historic Places in Baldwin County, Alabama

References

External links

 St. Paul's Magnolia Springs website

Churches completed in 1901
20th-century Episcopal church buildings
National Register of Historic Places in Baldwin County, Alabama
Churches on the National Register of Historic Places in Alabama
Episcopal church buildings in Alabama
Carpenter Gothic church buildings in Alabama
Churches in Baldwin County, Alabama